The Söhlde Formation is a geologic formation located in the federal states of Lower Saxony and Saxony-Anhalt in Germany. It preserves fossils from the Upper Cenomanian–lower Upper Turonian period.

See also

 List of fossiliferous stratigraphic units in Germany

References

 

Cretaceous Germany